Høiland is a Norwegian surname. Notable people with the surname include:

 Jan Høiland (1939–2017), Norwegian singer
 Jon Inge Høiland (born 1977), Norwegian footballer
 Ole Høiland (1797–1848), Norwegian burglar
 Rolv Høiland (1926–2001), Norwegian magazine editor
 Tommy Høiland (born 1989), Norwegian footballer

Norwegian-language surnames